Mach 3 is a 1987 3D shooter video game by Loriciels for Amiga, Amstrad CPC, Atari ST, MSX, Thomson TO7, ZX Spectrum and DOS. The DOS (PC) version uses CGA 320x200 video mode.

Gameplay 
The player controls a spacecraft and shoots various enemy crafts while avoiding mines and obstacles. During the intro screen, a sampled is phrase is spoken: "Get ready for Mach 3."

Reviews 
 http://www.atarimania.com/game-atari-st-mach-iii_9879.html
 https://worldofspectrum.org/archive/magazines/your-sinclair/64/0/1991/4/0#10
 http://amr.abime.net/review_12918

External links
Mach 3 at Atari Mania
Mach 3 at Lemon Amiga
Mach 3 at World of Spectrum

1987 video games
Amiga games
Atari ST games
MSX games
Amstrad CPC games
ZX Spectrum games
DOS games
Video games developed in France
Virtual Studio games